Wigfair Hall is a large country house standing in an elevated position above the River Elwy near the village of Cefn Meiriadog, Denbighshire, Wales.  It is a Grade II* listed building.

In 2017 Wigfair Hall was renovated and is now primarily used as a special event and wedding venue.

History

Wigfair was built on the site of an older house between 1882 and 1884 for Rev R. H. Howard.  It was designed by the Chester architect John Douglas.  Its large tower was originally a water tower for the house and was used to generate electricity.  The equipment for this purpose, including the tanks, pipework and generator, although no longer in use, is still present.

Architecture

Exterior
 
The house is in Jacobethan style, constructed in red Ruabon brick on a limestone plinth with sandstone dressings, and a Ruabon tile roof.  It has an L-shape with a main north wing and a west service wing.  The tower, with its pyramidal roof, rises from the west wing.  Projecting from the angle between the wings is the canted staircase window.  The main entrance is at the right side of the end of the gabled north wing, under an oriel window.

Interior

This includes "some good Douglas woodwork", it is "largely unaltered and retains high-quality original fittings in polished oak".  These fittings include an inner entrance screen, panelling, doors and architraves, fireplaces, a fitted sideboard, and a balustraded gallery.  The plaster ceilings are decorated with moulding and compartments, and in the stairhall is a limestone fireplace.

See also
List of houses and associated buildings by John Douglas

References

Further reading

Official Wigfair Hall, Wedding Venue in North Wales website
2017-Present Wigfair Hall Picture Gallery

Grade II* listed buildings in Denbighshire
Houses in Denbighshire
Grade II* listed houses
Houses completed in 1884
Jacobethan architecture
John Douglas buildings
Country houses in Wales